Something to Live For may refer to:

Music
 "Something to Live For" (song), a 1939 jazz standard by Duke Ellington and Billy Strayhorn
 Something to Live For (album), by John O'Callaghan, 2007
Something to Live For: The Music of Billy Strayhorn, an album by Art Farmer, 1987
Something to Live For: A Billy Strayhorn Songbook, an album by John Hicks, 1998

Film and television
 Something to Live For (film), a 1952 film directed by George Stevens
 Something to Live for: The Alison Gertz Story, a 1992 television film starring Molly Ringwald
 "Something to Live For" (My Name Is Earl), a television episode